Libertarian anarchism may refer to:
 Anarchism, a far-left political philosophy that advocates for a society without a state or hierarchy
 Autarchism, a political philosophy that upholds the principle of individual liberty, rejects compulsory government and supports its elimination in favor of "ruling oneself and no other"
 Free-market anarchism a branch of anarchism that believes in a free-market economic system based on voluntary interactions without the involvement of the state; a form of individualist anarchism, market socialism, and libertarian socialism
 Agorism, a revolutionary form of free-market anarchism that focuses on employing counter-economic activity to undermine the state
 Mutualism, an economic theory advocates a socialist society based on free markets and usufructs, i.e. occupation and use property norms
 Libertarianism, an individualist political philosophy that upholds liberty as its primary focus and principal objective. It originated as a form of left-wing politics, however in the mid-20th century, right-libertarian proponents of anarcho-capitalism and minarchism co-opted the term to advocate laissez-faire capitalism.
Anarcho-capitalism, a form of right-libertarianism that advocates the elimination of states in favor of a system of private property enforced by private agencies
 Voluntaryism, a political philosophy which holds that all forms of human association should be voluntary

See also 
 Libertarian Anarchy: Against the State, a book by Gerard Casey that promotes anarcho-capitalism

Anarchist schools of thought
Anarchism
Philosophical schools and traditions
Politics